Laura Escanes Espinosa (born 13 April 1996) is a Catalan model and influencer known for her work with the Majorica brand and for having paraded in the 080 Barcelona and New York Fashion Week for the Custo Barcelona brand. In 2018, she released her first book of poems, Piel de Letra.

Biography 
Laura Escanes was born in Barcelona on 13 April 1996, the daughter of Carles Escanes and Anna Espinosa. She has a younger brother named Albert. In 2015, she began her university studies in journalism, although shortly after she dropped out.

She created her Instagram profile in 2012 on the recommendation of her father to share photos of her travels. Since then, she has become more well known on social media. As of December 2019, she had more than 1 million followers.

In 2015, she collaborated with the Majorcan jewelry brand Majorica for the advertising campaign Why Not? In 2016, she paraded at Barcelona Fashion Week with the brand Custo Barcelona, and that same year she made her debut at New York Fashion Week, also parading for the same brand.

In November 2019, she attended as a guest at the People in Red Gala of the Fight AIDS Foundation.

In 2022, Laura wins the Lifestyle award at the first Idol Awards gala.

Also in 2022, it was announced she would be signed as a contestant on the Antena 3 program , being the second influencer to compete after her friend Mara Pombo.

Personal life 
She had a two-year relationship with professional poker player Ferran Reñaga. Shortly after their breakup, in 2015, she began a relationship with television personality Risto Mejide, 21 years her senior. They were married on 20 May 2017 at Mas Cabanyes. On 2 October 2019, they had their first daughter together, Roma. The couple announced their breakup on 25 September 2022.

In October 2022, the website Havannews published that the influencer maintains a relationship with Alberto Redondo Jiménez, better known as Mister Jägger, but in November 2022 she was photographed kissing the musician Álvaro de Luna.

Works

Fashion shows 
 2016: Fashion week Barcelona with the brand Custo Dalmau
 2016: New York Fashion Week with the brand Custo Dalmau

References 

Spanish women writers
Spanish models
Living people
1996 births